Edops ('swollen face') is an extinct genus of temnospondyl amphibian from the Early Permian Period. Unlike more advanced temnospondyls of the time, such as Eryops, Edops exhibited an archaic pattern of palatal bones, and still possessed various additional bones at the back of the skull. Edopoids also had particularly big premaxillae (the bones that form the tip of the snout) and proportionally small external nostrils. Within the clade, the most basal member seems to be Edops from the Early Permian Archer City Formation of the US, a broad-skulled animal with large palatal teeth. 

Fragmentary remains from the Viséan of Scotland appear to come from Edops or a close relative and hence predate the type Edops material of the Permian.

The American paleontologist Alfred Sherwood Romer named Edops "swollen face" (from Greek oidos "swelling" and Greek ops "face") in 1936, noting that the "premaxillaries are greatly thickened and produced externally into rounded swellings (whence the generic name)." (The Latinized spelling "edo" for "oidos" resembles the Latin word edo meaning a glutton, but this is not the formal etymology.) In a 1943 popular article, Romer explained that the original fossil find was nicknamed "Grandpa Bumps" for the lumps of bone, which had survived while the rest of the first skull had been largely destroyed.  Romer and his preparator R. V. Witter from Harvard University described Edops in more detail from additional fossil material in 1942.

References

Further reading 
 Ruta, M., Pisani, D., Lloyd, G. T. and Benton, M. J. 2007. A supertree of Temnospondyli: cladogenetic patterns in the most species-rich group of early tetrapods. Proceedings of the Royal Society B-Biological Sciences 274: 3087-3095

Permian temnospondyls of Europe
Edopoids
Prehistoric amphibian genera
Taxa named by Alfred Romer
Fossil taxa described in 1942